Samakhiali Junction railway station is a railway station belonging to Western Railway of Ahmedabad division.

History
The railway ran north from the port of Tuna towards Anjar in the Kutch. The railway was financed by the Maharao Khengarji Bawa of Cutch, and the initial section to Anjar was opened in 1905.  An extension from Anjar to the state capital of Bhuj was later made and lines opened in 1908. 
Varshamedi to Bhachau was opened in 1910. 15 miles from Anjar to Kandla was opened in 1930. Another line was laid from Kandla to Disa in 1950. During this time Samakhiali Railway station was opened.

Railway reorganization

Kutch State Railway was merged into the Western Railway on 5 November 1951, at which time the total length was 72 miles. After the gauge conversion of Viramgam–Wankaner–Gandhidham section in the earlier 1980s. The first train from Gandhidham to Mumbai was introduced on 2 Oct 1984.
Gauge conversion of Palanpur–Gandhidham was completed on 24 March 2006. New services were introduced via Palanpur.

Major trains

 15667/68 Kamakhya–Gandhidham Express
 22951/52 Bandra Terminus–Gandhidham Weekly Superfast Express
 12937/38 Garbha Express
 22973/74 Gandhidham–Puri Weekly Express
 12993/94 Gandhidham–Puri Weekly Superfast Express
 18501/02 Visakhapatnam–Gandhidham Express
 22483/84 Gandhidham–Jodhpur Express
 16505/06 Gandhidham–Bangalore City Express
 16335/36 Gandhidham–Nagercoil Express
 59425/26 Gandhidham–Palanpur Passenger
 19335/36 Gandhidham–Indore Weekly Express
 12473/74 Gandhidham–Shri Mata Vaishno Devi Katra Sarvodaya Express
 19115/16 Sayajinagari Express
 22955/56 Kutch Express
 14321/22 Ala Hazrat Express (via Bhildi)
 14311/12 Ala Hazrat Express (via Ahmedabad)
 11091/92 Bhuj–Pune Express
 19151/52 Palanpur–Bhuj Intercity Express
 22829/30 Shalimar–Bhuj Weekly Superfast Express
 22903/04 Bandra Terminus–Bhuj AC Superfast Express
 12959/60 Dadar–Bhuj Superfast Express

References

Railway stations in Kutch district
Ahmedabad railway division
Railway junction stations in Gujarat